The discography of Nicolás Jaar includes eight studio albums, ten extended plays, three official soundtracks, and many mixes and production credits. In addition to releasing music under his birth name, Jaar also releases music under the alias Against All Logic, sometimes shortened to A.A.L., as well as under the name Nico.

Albums

Against All Logic

Extended plays

Against All Logic

Compilations

Singles

Against All Logic

Soundtracks

Remixes

Edits

Unreleased edits

Miscellaneous tracks

Mixes

Production credits 

 Albums

 Facepaint by Buzzy Lee (2018)
 Spoiled Love by Buzzy Lee (2021)

 Tracks

References

External links 

 Official website
 Nicolás Jaar's discography at Discogs
 Nicolás Jaar's discography at AllMusic

Nicolas Jaar